Adalbert Ritter (29 April 1900 – 23 February 1945) was a Romanian football goalkeeper and referee.

International career
Adalbert Ritter played in the first official match of Romania's national team at the 1922 King Alexander's Cup, against Yugoslavia. He was also part of Romania's 1924 Summer Olympics squad.

Scores and results table. Romania's goal tally first:

Honours
Chinezul Timișoara
Divizia A: 1921–22, 1922–23, 1923–24, 1924–25, 1925–26

References

External links

1900 births
1945 deaths
Romanian footballers
Romania international footballers
Olympic footballers of Romania
Footballers at the 1924 Summer Olympics
Association football goalkeepers
Chinezul Timișoara players
Liga I players
Romanian football referees
Sportspeople from Timișoara